JTP may refer to:
 Jai Telangana Party, an Indian political party
 Jenkintown Posse, Barry and his friends on The Goldbergs (2013 TV series)
 Joe the Plumber
 Johor Technology Park
 Journal of Transpersonal Psychology
 Journal of Theoretical Politics
 Justin Pawlak (born 1979), American drifting driver
 .jtp, an extension given to Microsoft Windows Journal template files